William Edward Haupt (10 July 1885 Philadelphia, Pennsylvania – 16 April 1966 Montgomery County ?, Pennsylvania)  was an American racecar driver.

He was the son of Herman Haupt (born in 1843 in Germany died in  1916 in Pennsylvania) and Emma Lauschke (born 1851 in Germany died in 1920 in Pennsylvania) who Immigrated to America in 1864.

Haupt drove in 4 Indianapolis 500 mile races in 1913 thru 1915 and also in the 1920 race with his best finish in the 1913 race finishing 9th in 1918 was an Engineer for Haupt & Shaffer Co. and During WWII Haupt worked as an Engineer in the Philadelphia Navy Yard in the aircraft engine laboratory

Indy 500 results

References

1885 births
1966 deaths
Indianapolis 500 drivers
People from Northumberland County, Pennsylvania
Racing drivers from Pennsylvania
Racing drivers from Philadelphia